Thonikkal or Thonikal (Official Name 214F), (Tamil: தோணிக்கல், romanized: Tōṇikkal; Sinhala: තෝනිකල්, romanized: tōnikal) is a suburb and is considered to be one of the largest village in Vavuniya. It is the second most populated area in Vavuniya after Koomankulam. Administered by Vavuniya South Tamil Pradeshiya Sabha and Vavuniya Urban Councildue to its large area.

Etymology 

Some of the Indian Tamils who lived under the Madras Presidency during the British rule in India came to Sri Lanka in Dhoni, Stealthily. Initially  known as Kalla Thoni, the town later came to be known as Thonikkal.

Location 
It is bordered to the north by Vavuniya, to the east by Kovilkulam, to the west by Kanthapuram and to the south by Moonrumurippu.

References 

Populated places in Vavuniya District